is a district located in Tokushima, Japan.

Towns and villages
Naka

Mergers
On March 1, 2005 the towns of Aioi, Kaminaka and Wajiki, and the villages of Kisawa and Kito merged to form the new town of Naka.
On March 20, 2006 the towns of Hanoura and Nakagawa merged into the city of Anan.

Districts in Tokushima Prefecture